Langmuir may refer to:

 Langmuir (crater), an impact crater on the Moon's far side
 Langmuir (journal), an academic journal on colloids, surfaces and interfaces, published by the American Chemical Society
 Langmuir (unit), a unit of exposure of an adsorbate/gas to a substrate used in surface science to study adsorption
 Langmuir Cove, a cove in the north end of Arrowsmith Peninsula, Graham Land, Antarctica
 Langmuir monolayer, a one-molecule thick layer of an insoluble organic material spread onto an aqueous subphase in a Langmuir-Blodgett trough

People
 Alexander Langmuir (1910–1993), American  epidemiologist
 Gavin I. Langmuir (1924–2005), Canadian veteran of World War II, historian of anti-Semitism and medievalist at Stanford University
 Irving Langmuir (1881–1957), American Nobel Prize-winning chemist and physicist

See also